Valencienna sexguttata, the chalk goby, sixspot goby, sleeper blue dot goby, is a species of goby native to the Indian Ocean and the western Pacific Ocean. This species can reach a length of  TL. It can also be found in the aquarium trade.

References

External links
 

Valenciennea
Taxa named by Achille Valenciennes
Fish described in 1837